Freimuth is a surname. Notable people with the surname include:

 Axel Freimuth, German physicist
 Jörg Freimuth (born 1961), German high jumper
 Magnar Freimuth (born 1973), Estonian Nordic combined skier
 Rico Freimuth (born 1988), German decathlete
 Uwe Freimuth (born 1961), German decathlete